Proetidae is a family of proetid trilobites. The first species appeared in the Upper Ordovician, and the last genera survived until the Middle Permian. However, if the closely related family Phillipsiidae is actually a subfamily of Proetidae, then the proetids of Proetidae survive until the end of the Permian, where the last perish during the Permian–Triassic extinction event.

Genera
Proetidae ostensibly contains these following genera, though many may be placed in Phillipsiidae if the latter is, indeed, a distinct family.

Aayemenaytcheia
Aceroproetus
Alaskalethe
Altajaspis
Anambon
Anglibole
Angustibole
Anujaspis
Appendicysta
Aprathia
Archaeocoryphe
Ascetopeltis
Astroproetus (syn=Xiushuiproetus, Zhejiangoproetus)
Australokaskia
Bailielloides
Bapingaspis
Basidechenella
Beleckella
Belgibole
Benesovella
Bitumulina
Blodgettia
Bohemiproetus
Bolivicrania
Boliviproetus
Bollandia
Bonnaspidella
Borelia
Brevibole
Burgesina
Calybole
Camsellia
Carbonoproetus
Carlopsia
Carniphillipsia
Ceratoproetus
Chauffouraspis
Chaunoproetoides
Chaunoproetus
Chiides
Chiops
Chlupacula
Chuanqianoproetus
Clavibole
Comptonaspis
Coniproetus
Conophillipsia
Constantina
Coombewoodia
Craspedops
Crassibole
Crassiproetus
Cyphinioides
Cyphoproetus
Cyrtodechenella
Cyrtoproetus
Cyrtosymbole
Cystispina
Daihuaia
Dayinaspis
Dechenella
Dechenelloides
Dechenellurus
Deinoproetus
Deltadechenella
Diabole
Diacoryphe
Drevermannia
Dudu
Dushania
Effops
Ejinoproetus
Elegenodechenella
Elimaproetus
Elliptophillipsia
Endops
Engelomorrisia (syn=Capricornia)
Ensecoryphe
Eocyphinium
Eocyrtosymbole
Eodrevermannia
Eomicrophillipsia
Eopalpebralia
Eosoproetus
Eowinterbergia
Erbenaspis
Erbenites
Evagena
Exochops
Flexidechenella
Formonia
Francenaspis
Franconicabole
Frithjofia
Fuscinipyge
Ganinella
Gapeevella
Geigibole
Georhithronella
Gerastos
Gitarra
Globusia
Globusiella
Globusoidea
Gomiites
Gracemerea
Hassiabole
Hedstroemia
Helioproetus
Helmutia
Helokybe
Humeia
Humilogriffithides
Hunanoproetus
Hypaproetus
Jinia
Karginella
Kaskia
Kathwaia
Kerpenella
Khalfinella
Kolymoproetus
Kosovoproetus
Krambedrysia
Kulmiella
Kulmogriffithides
Lacunoporaspis
Laevibole
Langgonbole
Latibole
Latiglobusia
Latiproetus
Lauchellum
Lichanocoryphe
Linguaphillipsia
Liobole
Liobolina
Longilobus
Longiproetus
Lophiokephalion
Lugalella
Luojiashania
Macrobole
Mahaiella
Malayaproetus
Malchi
Mannopyge
Megaproetus
Menorcaspis
Merebolina
Metaphillipsia
Mezzaluna
Microspatulina
Mirabole
Monodechenella
Moravocoryphe
Moschoglossis
Myoproetus
Namuraspis
Neogriffithides
Neokaskia
Nitidocare
Nodiphillipsia
Oehlertaspis
Oidalaproetus
Orbitoproetus
Ormistonaspis
Omlistonia
Ormistoniella
Osmolskia
Otodechenella
Paladin
Palaeophillipsia
Paleodechenella
Palpebralia
Panibole
Parachaunoproetus
Paradechenella
Parafrithjofia
Paraglobusia
Paragriffithides
Paramirabole
Parangustibole
Parapalpebralia
Paraproetus
Parawarburgella
Particeps
Parvidumus
Paryfenus
Pedinocoryphe
Pedinodechenella
Perexigupyge
Perliproetus
Phillibolina
Philliboloides
Phyllaspis
Planilobus
Planokaskia
Plesiowensus
Podoliproetus
Pontipalpebralia
Praedechenella
Pragoproetus
Prantlia
Prodiacoryphe
Proetocephalus
Proetus
Pseudobollandia
Pseudocyrtosymbole
Pseudodechenella
Pseudodudu
Pseudogerastos
Pseudoproetus
Pseudosilesiops
Pseudospatulina
Pseudowaribole
Pudoproetus
Pulcherproetus
Pusillabole
Raerinproetus
Reediella
Rhenocynproetus
Rhenogriffides
Richterella
Rijckholtia
Rosehillia
Rugulites
Schaderthalaspis
Schizophillipsia
Schizoproetina
Schizoproetoides
Schizoproetus
Semiproetus
Sevillia
Silesiops
Simaproetus
Sinobole
Sinocyrtoproetus
Sinopaladin
Sinoproetus
Sinosymbole
Skemmatocare
Skemmatopyge
Spatulata (syn=Spatulina )
Spergenaspis
Spinibolops
Struveproetus
Sulcubole
Tawstockia
Taynaella
Tcherkesovia
Tetinia
Thaiaspella
Thalabaria
Thebanaspis
Tropidocare
Tschernyschewiella
Typhloproetus
Unguliproetus
Vandergrachtia
Vittaella
Wagnerispina
Waideggula
Waigatchella
Warburgella
Waribole
Weberiphillipsia
Westropia
Weyeraspis
Winiskia
Winterbergia
Witryides
Xenadoche
Xenoboloides
Xenocybe
Xenodechenella
Xiangzhongella
Xiushuiproetus
Yanshanaspis
Yichangaspis
Yishanaspis
Yuanjia (syn=Haasia)
Zhegangula
Zhejiangoproetus

References

 
Proetida
Trilobite families
Ordovician trilobites
Silurian trilobites
Devonian trilobites
Permian trilobites
Carboniferous trilobites
Late Ordovician first appearances
Guadalupian extinctions
Prehistoric arthropod families